Salut Joe! Hommage à Joe Dassin is an album containing 13 reinterpretations of Joe Dassin's most famous songs. It was released on February 7, 2006. Its total length is 00:45:52.

Songs
 "Le moustique (2:21) – Stefie Shock
 "Siffler sur la colline" (3:07) – Les Respectables
 "Dans les yeux d'Émilie" (4:10) – Pierre Lapointe
 "Dans la brume du matin"" (3:52) – Patrick Norman
 "Salut les amoureux" (4:03) – Guy A. Lepage & Marc Labrèche
 "Le petit pain au chocolat" (3:21) – Sébastien Lacombe
 "Il était une fois nous deux" (4:10) – Mélanie Renaud
 "Et si tu n'existais pas" (4:24) – DobaCaracol
 "À toi" (3:37) – Éric Lapointe
 "Bip-Bip" (2:30) – Les Breastfeeders
 "Les Champs Élysées" (2:26) – Mario Pelchat
 "L'Amérique" (2:41) – Raphaël Torr
 "L'été indien" (5:09) – Mara Tremblay & Stefie Shock

External links 
  Miomusik
  Archambault Musique

2006 compilation albums
Tribute albums